This is a list of shopping malls in Saudi Arabia.

Western Region 
Jeddah
 Mall of Arabia
 Red Sea Mall
 Serafi Mega Mall
 Haifa Mall
 Aziz Mall 
 Al Salaam Mall 
 Al Andalus Mall 
 Yasmin Mall 
 Al Mahmal Centre
 Al Khayyat Centre
 Jeddah Mall 
 Al Tahliyah Shopping Centre
 Ayah Mall
 Roshan Mall
 Roshana Mall
 Jeddah Park

Central 

Riyadh
 Kingdom Centre
 Al Faisaliyah Centre
 Centria Mall
 Al Nakheel Mall
 Granada Center
 Riyadh Gallery
 Panorama Mall 
 Hayyat Mall 
 Localizer Mall 
 Tala Mall 
 Hamraa Mall 
 Khurais Mall 
 Sahara Mall 
 Sahara Plaza 
 Riyadh Mall 
 Marina Mall 
 Salaam Mall 
 Al Qasr Mall
 Fortore Mall

Eastern Province 

Khobar
 Al Rashid Mall
 Al Fanar Mall
 Al Rahmaniya Mall
 Khobar Mall
 Lulu Hypermarket
 Mall of Dhahran
 Venicia Mall
Dammam
 Al Shatea Mall
 Al Danah Shopping Centre
 Crystal Mall
 Dareen Mall
 Lulu Hypermarket
 Marina Mall
 Taba Center
 Dammam Othaim Mall

Future malls 
 Jeddah Economic City Mall
 Alzahra Center 
Mall of Saudi

See also 
 Economy of Saudi Arabia
 Tourism in Saudi Arabia

Saudi Arabia
Shopping malls